Kang Chang-hee (Hanja: 姜昌熙 born 3 August 1946) is a South Korean politician who was the Speaker of the 19th National Assembly of South Korea, succeeding acting Speaker Chung Eui-hwa on 2 July 2012, for a two-year term. Kang was a member of the Saenuri Party (New Frontier Party, formerly the Grand National Party), which holds the largest number of seats in the 2012–2016 National Assembly. He was selected as the party candidate for Speaker on 31 May 2012, which effectively guaranteed he would become Speaker. He was officially elected when the National Assembly convened on 2 July 2012, gaining 195 of 283 votes. On assuming the office of Speaker, Kang was legally required, by the National Assembly Act, to become an unaffiliated member of the National Assembly.

Career 
Kang was a member of the South Korean military, before becoming a politician in 1980. He has served six non-consecutive terms as a member of the National Assembly (in the 11th, 12th, 14th, 15th, 16th and 19th National Assemblies), and is the first Speaker from the Chungcheong provinces. Previously he has held a number of posts including vice-president of the Grand National Party (November 2001 to March 2002) and as a Minister of Science and Technology (March 1998 to March 1999).

On the 2013 South Korean Constitution Day (17 July), Kang proposed an "advisory council for constitutional amendment", which was formed on 24 January 2014, with 15 members including academics, journalists and former judicial and government officials. On 28 November 2013, the Saenuri Party controversially elected their preferred candidate to head the Board of Audit and Inspection, after Kang refused to allow speeches by members of the opposition Democratic Party, although the opposition felt that Kang was not permitted to do so by law.

As part of his official duties, he has met a number of foreign dignitaries when they visited South Korea, and visited a number of countries. On 16 October 2012, Kang visited the University of Southern California, to look at the East Asian Library's collection of maps of the body of water between Korea and Japan, known then as the Sea of Korea and now known as the Sea of Japan. On 2 April 2013, Kang addressed the Congress of Peru during an official visit to Lima. Kang met the Secretary General of NATO, Anders Fogh Rasmussen during the latters visit to South Korea from 11–13 April 2013. On 9 October 2013, Kang visited Turkey to meet the Turkish President, Abdullah Gül, and spoke about the Turkish military contribution to the Korean War. On 17 October 2013 he met Rwandan Minister Louise Mushikiwabo after she attended a cyberspace conference in Seoul. Kang travelled to Beijing on 4 December 2013, to meet Zhang Dejiang, chairman of the Standing Committee of the National People's Congress of China, followed by a meeting with China's paramount leader Xi Jinping on 6 December, with both meetings focussing on China–South Korea relations and cooperation.

References

1946 births
Liberty Korea Party politicians
Speakers of the National Assembly (South Korea)
Living people
Members of the National Assembly (South Korea)
Korea Military Academy alumni
Kyungnam University alumni